Elachista obliquella is a moth of the family Elachistidae found in Europe.

Description
The wingspan is .The head is ochreous- whitish. Antennae whitish-ringed. Forewings light grey, irrorated with blackish ;a nearly straight central whitish fascia, sometimes ochreous tinged,in male slenderer and sometimes interrupted ; tips of apical cilia whitish. Hindwings are grey. The larva is grey-greenish ; head pale brown; 2 with two brown
spots.

Biology 
Adults are on wing from April to July and again in August in two generations per year.

The larvae feed on tor-grass (Brachypodium pinnatum), false-brome (Brachypodium sylvaticum), Bromopsis erecta, Bromopsis ramosa, reed grass (Calamagrostis species), acute sedge (Carex acuta), Carex hudsonii, Carex ornithopoda, Carex spicata, Carex sylvatica, cock's-foot (Dactylis glomerata), tufted hairgrass (Deschampsia cespitosa), fescue (Festuca species), wood-barley (Hordelymus europaeus), crested hair-grass (Koeleria macrantha), melic (Melica species) milletgrass {Milium species) and broad-leaved meadow-grass (Poa chaixii). They mine the leaves of their host plant. The mine starts as a narrow, brown, ascending corridor and most of the frass is deposited in the basal part. Later, the larva leaves this mine and makes a new mine in another leaf. This mine is an elongated, somewhat inflated blotch which occupies nearly the entire width of the leaf. They are dull grey green with a light brown head. Larvae can be found from autumn to mid-May and again in July.

Distribution
It is found from Scandinavia to the Iberian Peninsula, Italy and Romania and from Ireland to Ukraine. It is also found in Russia.

References

obliquella
Leaf miners
Moths described in 1854
Moths of Europe
Taxa named by Henry Tibbats Stainton